= Hot Freaks (band) =

Minneapolis rock band

- Origin: Minneapolis, Minnesota
- Genres: Alternative rock; indie rock; indie pop
- Years active: 2011–2015; 2020–present
- Labels: Nettwerk Music; Many Hats Distribution
- Members: Leo Vondracek; Darin Dahlmeier; Sarah Darnall; Cody Brown; Celeste Heule
- Website: hotfreaks.band

Hot Freaks is an American indie rock band formed in Minneapolis in 2011, The band was composed of lead singer Leo Vondracek and guitarist Darin Dahlmeier, bassist Sarah Darnall, drummer Cody Brown, and keyboardist Celeste Heule.

In 2011, the band released the song titled Puppy Princess onto YouTube which went viral on Tiktok a decade later.

== Band members ==
=== Current members ===
- Leo Vondracek - Lead Vocal (2011–present)
- Darin Dahlmeier - Guitar (2011–present)
- Sarah Darnall- Bass (2011–present)
- Cody Brown - Drums (2011–present)
- Celeste Heule - Keyboards (2011–present)

== Discography ==
=== Studio albums ===
- 2013: Hot Freaks
- 2023: Hot Freaks Forever
- 2026: Soft Body

=== EPs and Singles ===
- 2020: Paycheck 2 Paycheck
- 2021: Puppy Princess
- 2022: Lovely
- 2023: Let's Start a Country
- 2023: Boyfriend
- 2023: Together Above
- 2023: Stuart Little Vibes
- 2023: Free Holiday Gift EP
- 2026: Yo Quiero Ser Tu Novio
- 2026: Big Arms Boyfriend / Childhood Friends
- 2026: Getting Over You
- 2026: Girlfriend of the Mind
- 2026: Bad Boy
- 2026: Darkest of the Dark Nights
